Pine Ridge is an unincorporated community in Dawes County, Nebraska, United States.

History
A post office was established at Pine Ridge in 1911, and remained in operation until it was discontinued in 1945. The community was named after Pine Ridge, a natural ridge covered with pine trees.

References

Unincorporated communities in Dawes County, Nebraska
Unincorporated communities in Nebraska